The Arizona State Sun Devils football team represents Arizona State University in the sport of American football. The Sun Devils team competes in the Football Bowl Subdivision (FBS) of the National Collegiate Athletic Association (NCAA) and the South Division of the Pac-12 Conference (Pac-12). Arizona State University has fielded a football team since 1897. The Sun Devils are led by head coach Kenny Dillingham and play their home games at Sun Devil Stadium in Tempe, Arizona. The Sun Devils have won seventeen conference titles, including three Pac-12 titles.

A number of successful and professional football players once played for ASU. The school has 3 unanimous All-Americans and 16 consensus selections. Among the most lauded players the school has produced are Pat Tillman, Terrell Suggs, Mike Haynes, Darren Woodson, Charley Taylor, and John Henry Johnson.

In addition to its players, ASU's football program has had several notable head coaches, including Hall of Famers Dan Devine and John Cooper and national champion Dennis Erickson. The all-time school wins leader is Hall of Fame coach Frank Kush, for whom Frank Kush Field at Sun Devil Stadium is named. Kush also consistently led the Sun Devils to victory against the Arizona Wildcats, ASU's traditional rival, losing to the Wildcats only twice between 1963 and 1979.

History

Early history (1896–1957)
Frederick M. Irish served as the first head football coach at the Territorial Normal School, renamed Tempe Normal School in 1903 and now known as Arizona State University, coaching from 1896 to 1906 and compiling a record of 12–8. Territorial Normal did not field a football team in 1897, 1898, or 1901. George Schaeffer served as the head football coach at Tempe Normal School from 1914 to 1916, compiling a record of 7–8. Aaron McCreary oversaw the school's football program from 1923–1929. During this time, the school changed its nickname from the Owls to the Bulldogs and the name of the school was changed to Arizona State University. McCreary left ASU with a 25–17–4 record. Ted Shipkey led the Arizona State football program from 1930–1932, compiling a record of 13–10–2. Shipkey was replaced by Rudy Lavik, who led Arizona State to a less impressive 13–26–3 mark in his five seasons. Dixie Howell served as ASU's head coach from 1938 to 1941, compiling a record of 23–15–4. In 1947, Ed Doherty became head coach at Arizona State, where he compiled a 25–17 record from 1947 to 1950. He left after ASU five days after defeating rival Arizona, 47–13, because he felt that he didn't have enough job security.

Clyde Smith took over the reins of the Arizona State football program in 1952, and under his leadership, they compiled a record of 15–13–1. Smith resigned following the 1954 season. On February 5, 1955, Michigan State assistant coach Dan Devine accepted the head coaching position at Arizona State. Joining him as an assistant was Frank Kush, who would have even greater success at the school after Devine's departure. During his three years, Devine compiled a record of 27–3–1 (.887), including a spotless 10–0 mark during his final campaign. In that last season, Devine's team led the nation in total offense and scoring, averaging just under 40 points per game in the latter category. Devine's success at Arizona State resulted in an offer from Missouri, which he accepted on December 18, 1957.

Frank Kush era (1958–1979)

Frank Kush was promoted to the position of head coach at Arizona State, which he would hold for the next 22 years. During his time at Arizona State, Kush was known for being one of the most physically demanding coaches in the game. His daily football practices in the heat of the Arizona desert are still the stuff of legend today. One of his drills was known as "Bull in the Ring", whereupon he would have the players form a circle. He would put a player in the middle (most often, a player he felt needed "motivation"), call out a uniform number, and blow his whistle. That player would charge the player in the middle and the two would engage in contact until Kush blew the whistle again. Whichever of the two players gave the best effort would go back to the circle, while the player "dogging it" would stay in until Kush decided he could quit. Former NFL and Arizona State player Curley Culp once broke a teammate's facemask during this drill. Another of his drills (which was designed to see if his running backs could take punishment carrying the ball) consisted of having only a center, quarterback, and two running backs line up on offense, with no other offensive lineman, and run running plays against the entire defense. Kush would run a running back into the line time and time again so he could get used to the pounding he would take in games.

The most famous of Kush's motivational techniques was called "Mount Kush." Mount Kush was a steep hill near the Sun Devils' practice facility (Camp Tontozona) near Payson, Arizona with several large rocks, cacti, and no shade from the Arizona sun. If a player especially needed discipline in Kush's opinion, that player would have to run up and down that hill numerous times. During his lengthy career in the desert, Kush compiled a record of 176–54–1, with only one losing season. In his first 11 years, he captured two conference titles and finished runner-up five times. That success led to him accepting the head coaching job at the University of Pittsburgh on January 4, 1969. However, just five days later, Kush had a change of heart and returned to Arizona State.

Kush's return would begin a memorable era in Sun Devil football history with five consecutive Western Athletic Conference championships as the team won 50 of 56 games from 1969 to 1973. During this time, Arizona State won the 1970 Peach Bowl and the first three editions of the Fiesta Bowl. In 1974, the team dropped to 7–4, but bounced back with authority the following year when they went 12–0, capping the year with a thrilling 17–14 win over the Nebraska Cornhuskers in the Fiesta Bowl, a game in which Kush's son, Danny, kicked three field goals, including the game winner. A down year in 1976 saw the team fall to 4–7, but another comeback resulted the next year with a 9–3 mark. In that year's Fiesta Bowl, the Sun Devils lost a bowl game for the only time under Kush's leadership, with a 42–30 defeat to Penn State. In 1978, Kush's team once again finished 9–3, this time defeating Rutgers in the Garden State Bowl. That win would be one of the final highlights of Kush's tenure as controversy and scandal the next year toppled him from his head coaching position. In September 1979 former Sun Devil punter Kevin Rutledge filed a $1.1 million lawsuit against the school, accusing Kush and his staff of mental and physical harassment that forced him to transfer. The most dramatic charge was that Kush had punched Rutledge in the mouth after a bad punt in the October 28, 1978, game against the Washington Huskies. During the next few weeks, overzealous fans turned things ugly when the insurance office of Rutledge's father suffered a fire and the family's attorney received two death threats.

On October 13, 1979, Kush was fired as head coach for interfering with the school's internal investigation into Rutledge's allegations. Athletic director Fred Miller cited Kush's alleged attempts to pressure players and coaches into keeping quiet. The decision came just three hours before the team's home game against Washington. Kush was allowed to coach the game, with the Sun Devils pulling off an emotional 12–7 upset of the sixth-ranked Huskies, fueled by the angry crowd incensed by the decision. After the game ended, Kush was carried off the field by his team. The win gave him a 3–2 record on the season, but all three victories were later forfeited when it was determined that Arizona State had used ineligible players. After nearly two years, Kush would be found not liable in the case, but would be off the sidelines during 1980, the first time in more than 30 years that he had been away from the game. The case itself would have far-reaching implications for coaches everywhere, making them consider the different ways to best motivate and/or punish players. Future NFL players who played under Kush at Arizona State include Charley Taylor, Curley Culp, Danny White, Benny Malone, Mike Haynes, and John Jefferson and Steve Holden. Baseball Hall of Famer Reggie Jackson also played a year of football at Arizona State for Kush on a football scholarship before switching to baseball.

Darryl Rogers era (1980–1984)
Darryl Rogers replaced Kush and led the Sun Devils to a 37–18–1 record in five seasons. The best season of the Rogers era came in 1982, a 10–2 campaign that resulted in a Fiesta Bowl win and a No. 6 ranking in the final AP and Coaches' polls. Rogers accepted an offer to serve as head coach of the NFL's Detroit Lions and left ASU after the 1984 season.

John Cooper era (1985–1987)
John Cooper left his post as Tulsa head coach and became the head coach at Arizona State in 1985 where his teams played in three consecutive bowl games, including the 1987 Rose Bowl, during his three-year tenure. Notably, he was just 0–2–1 against arch-rival Arizona. He accepted the job as head coach at Ohio State on December 31, 1987. The 1986 team won the school's first Pacific-10 Championship and went on to defeat the Michigan Wolverines in the 1987 Rose Bowl.

Larry Marmie era (1988–1991)
ASU promoted Larry Marmie from defensive coordinator to head coach to replace Cooper. Marmie's tenure was marked by mediocrity and disappointment, with a 6–5 mark in 1988, a 6–4–1 record in 1989, a 4–7 campaign in 1990, and a 6–5 season in 1991. School administrators fired Marmie following the 1991 season, amidst fan impatience.

Bruce Snyder era (1992–2000)
Bruce Snyder left California to become ASU's head coach in 1992. Snyder's 58 wins and nine-year tenure as head coach at Arizona State each rank second in school history to marks set by Frank Kush. Snyder led ASU to four bowl games including a win in the 1997 Sun Bowl. More than 40 ASU players coached by Snyder were selected in the National Football League Draft, including seven in the first round, and more than 40 others signed free agent contracts in the National Football League. In 1996, Snyder led the Sun Devils to one of the finest seasons in school history and was named Pacific-10 Coach of the Year. The 1996 squad finished with an 11–1 record and captured the Pacific-10 championship. The Sun Devils stunned the top-ranked and two-time defending national champion Nebraska Cornhuskers in the season's second game. Arizona State reeled off the third undefeated regular season in school history en route 1997 Rose Bowl, where they came within 19 seconds of a victory over Ohio State. Had they won, the Sun Devils would have likely won at least a share of the national championship, as they would have been the only undefeated major-conference team in the nation. For his efforts that season, Snyder won a number of national coaching awards, including the Paul "Bear" Bryant Award and the Walter Camp Coach of the Year Award. Snyder stepped down as ASU head coach following the 2000 season.

Dirk Koetter era (2001–2006)
Boise State head coach Dirk Koetter was hired to replace Snyder in 2001. At Arizona State, Koetter compiled a 40–34 record and four Bowl appearances in six years. Under Koetter, who was also the offensive play caller, the Sun Devils became known for a vertical passing attack. On November 26, 2006, Koetter was terminated as the head football coach. His final game was the 2006 Hawaii Bowl on Christmas Eve, a 41–24 loss.

Dennis Erickson era (2007–2011)

Seasoned coaching veteran Dennis Erickson left Idaho for the opportunity to lead his fourth BCS program. Athletic director Lisa Love hired him on December 9 to replace the recently fired Dirk Koetter. Arizona State was Erickson's third head coaching stint in the Pacific-10, after Washington State and Oregon State. In addition to Idaho, Erickson also had college head coaching tenures at Wyoming and Miami, as well as in the NFL with the Seattle Seahawks and San Francisco 49ers.

Arizona State paid $2.8 million to Koetter and a $150,000 buyout to Idaho to complete the hiring of Erickson to a five-year contract. He immediately paid dividends for ASU, leading the Sun Devils to a 10–2 regular season record in 2007, a share of the Pacific-10 title, and a berth in the Holiday Bowl. Erickson was named the 2007 Pacific-10 Coach of the Year, becoming the first to ever win the award at three different Pacific-10 schools. He also coached another major award winner; placekicker Thomas Weber was named the Lou Groza Award winner. Erickson worked for the relatively low salary of $500,000 from ASU in his first season, with another $2 million paid by the 49ers for the last year of his NFL contract. The remaining four years of the original ASU contract paid $1.275 million per year. In 2008 the Arizona Board of Regents had approved a contract extension to keep Erickson at Arizona State through June 2012. Erickson's early success at ASU was not sustained, as the Sun Devils failed to have another winning season and lost three of four Territorial Cup rivalry games against Arizona. In his final four seasons, Erickson was 21–28 overall and 14–22 in conference. After opening the 2011 season with a promising 6–2 record, Arizona State suffered four straight Pac-12 defeats in November to end the regular season, and Erickson was fired on November 28. He was allowed to coach in their bowl game on December 22, but ASU was soundly beaten 56–24 by Boise State in the Maaco Bowl in Las Vegas for their fifth consecutive loss.

Todd Graham era (2012–2017)
Todd Graham was announced as Arizona State University's head coach on December 14, 2011. Graham came to ASU after only one season at Pittsburgh, informing his players and assistant coaches of his decision to leave Pitt for ASU via text message. Graham also previously served as head coach at Rice for one season and Tulsa for four seasons.

In his first season at Arizona State, the Sun Devils went 8–5 securing their first winning season since 2007. With a win in the Kraft Fight Hunger Bowl against the Navy Midshipmen, the 2012 Sun Devils won the final three games of the season for the first time since 1978. ESPN's Pac-12 Blog writer Ted Miller called Todd Graham's first season at Arizona State an "unquestioned success." In 2013, Graham continued to build positive momentum and led ASU the Pac-12 South title after defeating UCLA and rival Arizona. ASU finished the season 10–4 and ranked No. 21 in the AP Poll and No. 20 in the Coach's Poll. For his efforts in leading ASU to a Pac-12 South championship, Graham received the 2013 Pac-12 Coach of the Year Award. In 2014, ASU finished with yet another 10 win season by going 10–3 and ranking No. 12 in the final AP Poll and No. 14 in the final Coach's Poll. The season was capped off with Graham leading the Sun Devils to victory over Duke University in the Sun Bowl. The 2015 season saw a big drop off for the program as the Sun Devils finished a disappointing 6–7 with a 42–43 loss to the West Virginia Mountaineers in the Cactus Bowl. The trend continued into the next two seasons. The Sun Devils finished 2016 on a 6-game losing streak which culminated in a 5–7 record. 2017 would be Graham's final season. The team improved only slightly, finishing 7–6 with a Sun Bowl loss to North Carolina State, 31–52. Graham and Arizona State agreed to part ways on November 26, 2017 following a 7–5 regular season.

Herm Edwards era (2018–2022)

On December 3, 2017, longtime NFL coach and ESPN analyst Herm Edwards was announced as the next head coach of the Sun Devils. Edwards kicked off the 2018 season with a 2–0 record, including a marquee win over then #15 Michigan State. Despite the promising start, the Devils dropped four of their next five games, sitting with a 1–3 conference record. Arizona State surged, winning their next three, but fell just short to Oregon and a Pac-12 South title. The Territorial Cup was played at Arizona Stadium on Saturday, November 24. Arizona led the Sun Devils by 19 points entering the fourth quarter, but a wild comeback by ASU, capped off by what would've been a game winning field goal by Arizona, resulted in the cup staying in Tempe. The Sun Devils then faced Fresno State In the Las Vegas Bowl, losing 31–20 and completing the season with a 7–6(5–4) record. Herm Edwards started his second season off 3–0, once again beating #18 Michigan State, this time on the road. ASU dropped their conference opener against Colorado, but bounced back with two straight wins, including a victory over #15 Cal to improve to 2–1 in conference play before dropping four consecutive games, officially disqualifying them from the Pac-12 South title. Arizona State shocked #6 Oregon at home, winning 31–28 in front of a packed stadium. The Sun Devils capped off the season with a win over rival Arizona, 24–14, and a Sun Bowl victory over Florida State, 20–14, finishing with a record of 8–5(4–5). Due to the COVID-19 pandemic Pac-12 teams had only six games scheduled. Arizona State dropped their first game to #20 USC 28–27 in heartbreaking fashion, and their following two contests were cancelled due to COVID complications within the Arizona State program. The Sun Devils returned from their nearly month long hiatus with a game versus UCLA, which they lost at home 25–18. ASU traveled to take on Arizona in Tucson for the 94th installment of the Territorial Cup. The Sun Devils slaughtered the Wildcats, 70–7, retaining the Cup for the third straight year. In their fourth and final game of the season, Arizona State capped off the season with a 46–33 win over Oregon State to finish the season 2–2 (2–2). In June 2021, rumors began circulating of several NCAA violations committed by Herm Edwards and the Arizona State staff, which were confirmed by several articles, including one published on June 23 by Pete Thamel of Yahoo! Sports. As a result of the allegations, tight ends coach Adam Breneman, defensive backs coach Christian Hawkins, and wide receivers coach Prentice Gill were placed and remain on administrative leave. Despite the numerous allegations of violations and rumors that the entire staff may be fired after the season, Herm Edwards and his Sun Devils finished 8-5 overall and (6-3) in Pac-12 play. The season concluded with a 20-13 loss to Wisconsin in the SRS Distribution Las Vegas Bowl. During the 2021-2022 offseason, multiple coaches including Zak Hill and Antonio Pierce resigned.  17 players including the starting quarterback Jayden Daniels and All-American linebacker Eric Gentry, entered the transfer portal as a result of the investigation and NIL. On September 18th, 2022, Arizona State fired Edwards the day following a 30-21 loss to Eastern Michigan.

Conference affiliations
 Independent (1897–1930)
 Border Conference (1931–1961)
 Western Athletic Conference (1962–1977)
 Pac-12 Conference (1978–present)

Championships

Conference championships
Arizona State has won 17 conference championships, seven in the Border Conference, seven in the Western Athletic Conference, and three in the Pac-12 Conference.

† Co-champions

Division championships
Arizona State won the 2013 Pac-12 South division championship.

Unclaimed National Championships

Despite being the only team to finish undefeated in the 1975 season, ASU was ranked 2nd place in both the AP and Coaches rankings. However, on January 17, 1976 Sporting News Ranked ASU as the #1 team in College Football for the 1975 season. The National Championship Foundation also recognized ASU as the #1 ranked team in the nation. ASU was also ranked #1 in 1970 by the Poling System (1935-1984). http://fs.ncaa.org/Docs/stats/football_records/2018/FBS.pdf The unfortunate disadvantage that ASU had was that they did not come from a powerhouse conference. That being said, they opened the door for many universities from smaller conferences to compete in big bowls/national championships such as Boise State, UCF, Tulane, BYU and Utah.

Bowl games

Arizona State has played in 33 bowl games in its history. The Sun Devils have a bowl record of 15–17–1.

Head coaches

Home stadiums

The Sun Devils play their home games at Frank Kush Field at Sun Devil Stadium in Tempe, Arizona. Sun Devil Stadium was constructed in 1958 and originally held a capacity of 30,000.

On September 21, 1996, the playing surface was renamed Frank Kush Field after the long time ASU coach in a 19–0 upset of then top-ranked Nebraska.

Prior to the construction of Sun Devil Stadium, the Sun Devils played their home games at the following locations:
 1897–1926 Normal Field
 1927–1935 Irish Field
 1936–1957 Goodwin Stadium

Culture

 Colors – Arizona State's traditional colors are maroon and gold.
 Songs  – The fight songs for Arizona State are "Maroon and Gold" and "Go Go Devils". After a touchdown "Maroon and Gold" is played. After a field goal "Go Go Devils" is played. For big plays, a shortened version of either song is played.
 Mascot – Arizona State's mascot is "Sparky the Sun Devil". Sparky was adopted as ASU's mascot in 1946 following a vote was held to replace the Bulldog, the mascot at the time.
 Devil Walk  – Prior to each home game, fans and the Sun Devil Marching Band welcomes the team inside Desert Financial Arena as they head to the football stadium. At the conclusion of the event, the marching band performs a short concert.
 Marching Band  – (see Arizona State University Sun Devil Marching Band)
 Stomp the Bus – The entrance video of the Sun Devils featuring a giant Sparky crushing the opposing team's bus underfoot

Arizona State fields a more-than-300-member marching band that performs at all home football games, bowl games, and the rivalry game with the University of Arizona. In addition to halftime shows and stand tunes, the Sun Devil Marching Band always play the Arizona State fight songs and the Alma Mater.

Rivalries

Arizona

Arizona State's longest and most intense rivalry is with the University of Arizona. The football game between the schools is nicknamed The Duel in the Desert, and the winner of the game receives the Territorial Cup. Arizona State won the first matchup in 1899 by a score of 11–2. Arizona holds the all-time series lead with a record of 49–45–1.

Since becoming a university in 1958, Arizona State has the overall lead in the rivalry series with a record of 31–24–1. Since ASU and Arizona became Pac-12 Conference members in 1978, Arizona leads the series 19–16–1. In recent contests, an unranked Sun Devils team upset a ranked Arizona Wildcats team 30–29 in Tucson in 2010. After a strong start in 2011, ASU ended the season with a 31–27 loss to Arizona in Tempe. The Sun Devils finished the 2012 season with a win over the No. 24 ranked Wildcats in Tucson by a score of 41–34. In 2013, the No. 13 ranked Sun Devils beat the Wildcats 58–21 in Tempe. In 2014, the Wildcats hosted the game and beat the Sun Devils 42–35 to claim the Pac-12 South championship.

Practice facilities

Bill Kajikawa Practice Fields

Bill Kajikawa Practice Fields, located on Sixth Street and Rural Road, is normally where Sun Devil football team practices when weather permits.

Camp Tontozona
An Arizona State University property, is a  camp just outside Payson created by former legendary coach Frank Kush was used as a bonding place for his players. Tontozona has marked the unofficial start of the Sun Devils' seasons from 1960–2008. Due to the knack of losing practices to rainouts, short and torn up fields leading to excessive injuries, and travel costs, the team decided to move camp back to Tempe campus with the arrival of the Devil Dome. After a 4-year absence the Sun Devils returned to Camp Tontozona starting in Aug 2012. The team was able to make the return after a short fund raising effort by fans and alumni brought in over $160,000.

Verde Dickey Dome
Formerly opened as Devil Dome and nicknamed,"The Bubble", $8.4 million practice facility broke ground on May 15, 2008 to provide a climate controlled space for the Sun Devil football team, Sun Devil Marching Band, ASU Intramurals and for other athletic department events. Before its full completion and turn over from the contractor to the university on the night of August 28, 2008 a powerful storm brought it down. The Bubble was re-inflated early October and was fully repaired for use in July 2009. During the 2009 season the facility was renamed and dedicated to generous donor Dr. Verde Dickey as the Verde Dickey Center, to not only commemorate his donation for the facility but also his donations to Sun Devil Marching Band and projects such as renovation of locker rooms in Wells Fargo Arena and Sun Devil Stadium, Weatherup Basketball Center, The Athletes Performance Center, John Spini Gymnastics Center, and wrestling practice facility.

All-Americans

 1931
Norris Steverson 
 1950
Wilford White 
 1965
Ben Hawkins 
 1967
Curley Culp 
 1968
Ron Pritchard  †
 1969
Art Malone 
 1970
J. D. Hill 
Gary Venturo 
Windlan Hall 
Mike Tomco 
 1971
Windlan Hall 
Junior Ah You 
Woody Green 
 1972
Woody Green †
Steve Holden 
 1973
Woody Green †
Danny White 
 1974
Bob Breunig 
John Houser 
Freddie Williams 
Clifton Alapa 
Kory Schuknecht 
Mike Haynes 
 1975
Mike Haynes  †
Larry Gordon 
John Jefferson 
Freddie Williams 
Willie Scroggins 
Randy Moore 
Mike Martinez 
 1976
John Harris 
 1977
George Fadok 
Al Harris 
John Harris 
John Jefferson †
Tim Peterson 
Dennis Sproul 
 1978
Al Harris ‡
 1979
Bob Kohrs 
Mark Malone 
 1980
John Mistler 
Willie Gittens 
Vernon Maxwell 
Mike Richardson 
 1981
Mike Black 
Mike Pagel 
Dan Mackie 
Vernon Maxwell 
John Meyer 
Mike Richardson †
Gerald Riggs 
Luis Zendejas 
 1982
Mike Black 
Jim Jeffcoat 
Vernon Maxwell 
Mike Richardson †
Luis Zendejas  †
 1983
David Fulcher 
 1984
Doug Allen 
Darryl Clack 
David Fulcher †
Tom Magazzeni 
Jim Meyer 
Dan Saleaumua 
Mark Shupe 
Luis Zendejas 
 1985
Greg Battle 
Aaron Cox 
David Fonoti 
David Fulcher †
Dan Saleaumua 
Mike Schuh 
Scott Stephen 

 1986

Aaron Cox 
Jeff Gallimore 
Darryl Harris 
Skip McClendon 
Randall McDaniel 
Dan Saleaumua 
Scott Stephen 
Danny Villa †
Channing Williams 
Darren Willis 
 1987
Eric Allen 
Greg Clark 
Aaron Cox 
Darryl Harris 
Randall McDaniel †
Shawn Patterson 
 1988
Mark Tingstad 
 1989
Nathan LaDuke 
Ron Fair 
 1990
Nathan LaDuke 
 1992
Shante Carver 
Brett Wallerstedt 
 1993
Shante Carver 
 1995
Juan Roque 
Jake Plummer 
 1996
Terry Battle 
Jake Plummer 
Keith Poole 
Derrick Rodgers 
Juan Roque †
 1997

Ryan Kealy 
Victor Leyva 
Kyle Murphey 
Grey Ruegamer 
Jeremy Staat 
Pat Tillman 
 1998
Steven Baker 
Todd Heap 
Scott Peters 
J.R. Redmond 
Grey Ruegamer 
 1999
Marvel Smith 
Todd Heap 
 2000
Adam Archuleta 
Todd Heap 
Terrell Suggs 
 2001

Levi Jones 
Shaun McDonald 
Jason Shivers 
Terrell Suggs 
 2002
Shaun McDonald 
Terrell Suggs ‡
Chaz White 
 2004
Derek Hagan 
Chris MacDonald 
Zach Miller 
 2005
Terry Richardson 
Derek Hagan 
Rudy Carpenter 
 2006
Dexter Davis 
Travis Goethel 
Zach Miller  †
 2007
Omar Bolden 
Robert James 
Thomas Weber †
 2012
Will Sutton  †
 2013
Will Sutton 
 2014
Jaelen Strong 
 2016
Zane Gonzalez  ‡

† Consensus All-Americans

‡ Unanimous All-Americans

College Football Hall of Fame Members

Pro Football Hall of Fame Members

Other notable players

 Junior Ah You – Retired CFL Hall of Fame Defensive end
 Brandon Aiyuk – Current NFL Wide receiver and return specialist for the San Francisco 49ers
 Eric Allen – Retired NFL Cornerback
 Kalen Ballage RB, Miami Dolphins
 Ron Brown – Retired NFL Wide receiver
 Dave Buchanan – Retired CFL all-star Running back
 Vontaze Burfict LB, free agent
 Shante Carver – Retired NFL Defensive end ASU Hall Of Fame
 Aaron Cox – Retired NFL Wide receiver
 Ken Dyer – AFL and NFL player
 George Flint – Retired AFL Guard
 David Fulcher – Retired NFL Defensive back
 Mark Gastineau – Retired NFL Defensive end
 John F. Goodman – Retired United States Marine Corps Lieutenant General; Former NFL Quarterback
 Larry Gordon – Retired NFL Linebacker
 Bruce Hardy – Retired NFL Tight end
 N'Keal Harry – Current NFL wide receiver for the Chicago Bears
 James Hood – Retired NFL CFL Wide receiver
 Bernard Henry – Retired NFL Wide receiver
 Jim Jeffcoat – Retired NFL Defensive tackle
 John Jefferson – Retired NFL Wide receiver
 Paul Justin – Retired NFL Quarterback
 Kyle Kingsbury – former Defensive tackle, a Mixed Martial Artist under contract as a light heavyweight in the Ultimate Fighting Championship
 Art Malone – Retired NFL Running back
 Benny Malone – Retired NFL Running back
 Mark Malone – Retired NFL Quarterback
 Isaiah Mustafa – former NFL Wide receiver, best known for his appearance on Ugly Betty and the Old Spice Advertisements
 Brock Osweiler – Retired NFL Quarterback
 Mike Pagel – Retired NFL Quarterback
 Jake Plummer – Retired NFL Quarterback
 Damarious Randall – Current free agent, former NFL Defensive back for the Las Vegas Raiders
 J.R. Redmond – Retired NFL Running back
 Mike Richardson – Retired NFL Safety
 Gerald Riggs – Retired NFL Running back
 Derrick Rodgers – Retired NFL Linebacker
 Marvel Smith – Retired NFL Offensive lineman
 Phillipi Sparks – Retired NFL Defensive back
 Jeremy Staat – former NFL Defensive lineman, served in the Iraq War
 Terrell Suggs – current free agent NFL Outside linebacker, formerly of the Baltimore Ravens and Arizona Cardinals
 Shawn Swayda – former NFL Defensive end
 Pat Tillman – former NFL Safety, killed by Friendly fire while serving in Operation Enduring Freedom
 Jeff Van Raaphorst – Retired NFL Quarterback, Rose Bowl Hall of Fame
 Danny White – Retired NFL Quarterback
 Darren Woodson – Retired NFL Safety

Future non-conference opponents
Announced schedules as of February 6, 2022.

References

External links

 

 
American football teams established in 1897
1897 establishments in Arizona Territory